Deradicalization refers to a process of encouraging a person with extreme political, social or religious views to adopt more moderate positions on the issues.

Measures and projects

Google's think tank Jigsaw has been developing a new program − called the Redirect Method − in which Google's search advertising algorithms and YouTube's video platform are used to target aspiring ISIS recruits and ultimately dissuade them from joining the group.

Machine learning and scientific inquiry can be used to find the most effective contents (such as videos) for deradicalization, to learn why people leave terrorist movements and to identify aspiring violent radicals.

Humera Khan, executive director of the Islamic deradicalization group Muflehu, states that deradicalization also needs human interaction and a supportive community backing up the person's decision to turn away from extremism.

Renee Garfinkel also notes that personal relationships play a major role in the transformation of involvement in violence to non-violent activity, saying "change often hinges on a relationship with a mentor or friend who supports and affirms peaceful behavior".

Many nations and universities are engaging in deradicalization efforts.

Deradicalization programmes in Western Europe 
Multiple Western Europe countries have implemented deradicalization programs in a variety of forms, specifically after September 11, 2001. In more recent years, some countries saw a drastic  increases in the number of jihadists attacks, especially France. In September 2016, France opened its first deradicalization centre in Pontourny. The original plan was to have the Pontourny center the first of multiple in the country, however, the Pontourny centre turned out to be failure. Less than a year after it opened, the deradicalization centre in Pontourny had no residents.  Spain launched its prison deradicalization program for jihadists in 2016, and suspended it in 2022, as only four inmates had signed up for it.

Criticism
Sociologist Gérald Bronner calls the notion of "deradicalization" flawed, saying "It means that you can take an idea or a belief out of the brain, and I think that’s just impossible" and instead suggests "not a kind of mental manipulation but the opposite — mind liberation, a strengthening of their intellectual immune systems".

One study found that Islamic State supporters responded to counter-radicalization efforts by censoring expression of pro-IS views and moving their activity from public social media to Telegram, a non publicly viewable medium.

See also
 Global Community Engagement and Resilience Fund
 Targeted advertising
 Filter bubble
 Education in the Middle East and North Africa

Bibliography 

 Ramakrishna, Kumar. Extremist Islam: Recognition and Response in Southeast Asia. United States, Oxford University Press, 2022.

References

Counterterrorism
Propaganda
Prevention
Radicalization